The 1991 William & Mary Tribe football team represented the College of William & Mary as an independent during the 1991 NCAA Division I-AA football season. Led by Jimmye Laycock in his 12th year as head coach, William & Mary finished the season with a record of 5–6.

Schedule

References

William and Mary
William & Mary Tribe football seasons
William and Mary Indians football